The Lancia Kappa is a passenger car produced by Lancia between 1919 and 1922. Lancia's first post-war model, it was an updated version of the earlier Theta. 1,810 were made in total, surpassing the Theta as the best-selling Lancia motor car at the time.

Specifications
The Kappa's Tipo 64 side valve inline-four was Lancia's first engine with a separate cylinder head, as opposed to the earlier monobloc designs.

The separate body was built on a ladder frame; front and rear there were solid axles on semi-elliptic leaf springs, brakes were on the transmission and on the rear wheels. The transmission was a 4-speed gearbox with a multi-plate dry clutch.

References

Bibliography

 
 

Kappa (1919)
Cars introduced in 1919
1920s cars